USS LST-511 was an  built for the United States Navy during World War II.

Construction
LST-511 was laid down on 22 July 1943, at Seneca, Illinois, by the Chicago Bridge & Iron Company; launched on 30 November 1943; sponsored by Mrs. James V. Gaynor; and commissioned on 3 January 1944.

Service history
During World War II, LST-511 was assigned to the European Theater and participated in the invasion of Normandy in June 1944. LST-511 was one of the eight LSTs participating in "Exercise Tiger", a practice for D-Day on 28 April, during which German E-boats attacked, hitting three of the eight LSTs. Two sank immediately and the third was towed to port by its own LCVPs. Designated as a hospital ship for the invasion with two doctors and a contingent of corpsmen, she completed 50 round trips from English ports to the Normandy beaches.

Upon her return to the United States, she was decommissioned on 19 December 1945, and struck from the Naval Vessel Register on 8 January 1946. On 17 February 1948 the ship was sold to the Anglo-Canadian Pulp & Paper Mills of Quebec, Canada, for operation and renamed Guy Bartholomew .  She was then subsequently purchased by Agence Maritime, and the renamed Fort Kent. She was in service into the 1970s. She foundered 7 December 1992, off Long Harbour, Newfoundland. 

LST-511 received one battle star for World War II service.

See also
 List of United States Navy LSTs

References
 
 

 

LST-491-class tank landing ships
World War II amphibious warfare vessels of the United States
Ships built in Seneca, Illinois
1943 ships